Vester, Nørre and Øster Søgade (lit. "West, North and East Lake Street") is a succession of streets along the eastern side of The Lakes in central Copenhagen, Denmark. The streets run from Gammel Kongevej to the south to the beginning of Østerbrogade at Lille Trianglen in the north. Vester Søgade runs from Gammel Kongevej to Gyldenløvesgade, Nørre Søgade runs from Gyldenløvesgade to Dronning Louises Bro, and Øster Søgade from Dronning Louises Bro to Lille Triangel.

History
 
 
 
The street is situated on the former glacis outside Copenhagen's long gone bastioned fortifications. A path known as Kærlighedsstien ("The Lover's Path") followed the east side of The Lakes where Søgade runs today. The north part of the street was created after the fortifications were decommissioned in the second half of the 19th century. Nørre Voldgade was completed in July 1873.

Nørre and Øster Søgade were established in the 19th century. Vester Søgade, on the other hand, was not created until Sankt Jørgens Sø was given up as a water reservoir.

In the 1960s, there were plans to make the streets part of a six-lane motorway, Søringen, which was supposed to connect the northern part of Zealand with a new modern city centre in the Vesterbro area but the plans were abandoned.

Notable buildings
 
The eastern side of the street is mostly lined with residential buildings of a diverse character which reflect the difference in their age. Søtorvet, a stately, symmetrical development flanking the streets Frederiksborggade, Gothersgade and Vendersgade at the end of Queen Louise's Bridge, was built from 1872 to 1875. The adjacent building at Nordre Søgade 8 is the former Østersøgade Gymnasium. The school moved to Gentofte in 1964 and is bnow known as Kildegård Privatskole.

 
Just north of Søtorvet, the street passes the rear side of the former Copenhagen Municipal Hospital, now part of University of Copenhagen's City Campus. Completed in 1863, the hospital was one of the first buildings to be built outside the old fortifications. Then follows a number of late 19th century apartment buildings. Rørholm at Øster Søgade 32 was completed in 1884. North of Sølvgade and Fredens Bro, the street is bordered by Kartoffelrækkerne, an extensive area of terraced houses built by the Workers' Building Society to provide healthy homes for the city's workers.

Just south of Søtorvet, at the end of a small cul-de-sac, is Hotel Kong Arthur. The building was originally a home for apprentices. It was designed by Georg Ebbe Wineken Møller and inaugurated on 4 October 1882. The former Catholic Apostolic church on the corner of Nørre Søgade and Gyldenløvesgade was inaugurated on 1 August 1870.

 
Vester Søgade is dominated by Vestersøhus which was designed by Kay Fisker and C. F. Møller and completed in 1939. With its balcony-bay window concept, it became a model for later Danish residential architecture. The building was listed in 1994.

South of Vester Søhus, on the corner of Gammel Kongevej, stands the 18-storey Scandic Copenhagen Hotel.

Cultural references
Hotel Sheraton (Vester Søgade 6, now Hotel Scandic) is used as a location at 0:37:08 in the 1972 Olsen-banden film The Olsen Gang's Big Score. Egon (Ove Sprogøe) later wakes up on a bench in Vester Søgade at 0:50:02 in the same film.

See also
 Vester, Nørre and Øster Farimagsgade

References

Streets in Copenhagen